Maru (born May 24, 2007) is a male Scottish Straight cat in Japan who has become popular on YouTube. Videos featuring Maru have been viewed over 479 million times, and at one point held the Guinness World Record for the most YouTube video views of an individual animal. Maru has been described as the "most famous cat on the internet".

History 
Maru's videos are under the account name of mugumogu. His owner is rarely seen in the videos. The videos include title cards in English and Japanese setting up and describing the events, and often show Maru playing in cardboard boxes, indicated by "I love a box!" in his first video.

Videos of Maru are collections of clips—usually around 3–7 minutes long—of Maru engaging in various activities, with most videos having a central theme or activity as indicated by the title card.  Maru, during these videos, shows his fascination with boxes, his placid personality, his amusing antics, and an inventive intelligence and intuition.

In August 2013, Maru's owner adopted a kitten named Hana from a veterinarian.  During the two-week trial period, Maru and Hana got along very well and Mugumogu decided to make Hana a new member of their family.

In November 2020, Maru's owner adopted another kitten named Miri from a neighbor who had rescued her from a storm drain.

Fame 
Entertainment Weekly mentioned Maru alongside Keyboard Cat and Nora in its "Notable Kitty Videos" article. The New York Times mentioned Maru in an article about cats and dogs in the media and included pictures of the cat. Maru's videos have been featured on the Fresh Step's commercial on the Fresh Step YouTube Channel. Maru has also been featured in advertisements within Japan, for various products. , Maru's channel is the 7th most subscribed in Japan.

In March 2017, Maru was certified as the most viewed animal on YouTube. His videos have been watched a total of 405,235,246  times as of 3 January 2019.

Published media 
In September 2009, a book and DVD entitled I am Maru was released in Japan. A further DVD called Maru Desu followed in February the year after. A second book titled More Maru was released on August 31, 2011, but only in Japanese.

See also 

 List of individual cats
 Grumpy Cat
 Lil Bub
 Nora (cat)
 Keyboard Cat

References

External links 
 Maru's blog

2007 animal births
Animals on the Internet
Individual cats in Japan
Internet memes about cats
Japanese Internet celebrities
Scottish Fold